Julian Jrummi Walsh (ウォルシュ・ジュリアン・ジャミイ Uorushu Jurian Jamii, born 18 September 1996 in Kingston, Jamaica) is a Jamaican-born Japanese track and field athlete competing in the sprints.  He is the son of reggae drummer Emanuel Walsh (Pablo Moses, the Mighty Diamonds, Garnett Silk and John Holt), who married a Japanese woman and has lived in Japan for almost 20 years.  Walsh moved to Japan as a toddler and grew up in Higashimurayama.  He started running track in 10th grade, but his school had no facilities to practice on and no coach.  He couldn't take track seriously until the following year.  After two seasons, he led off the Japanese silver medal winning relay team at the 2014 World Junior Championships in Athletics.  That same summer he moved into senior level competition, anchoring the Asian-Pacific 4x400 metres relay team at the 2014 IAAF Continental Cup.  Two years later, he qualified for the 2016 Olympics in the 400 metres, by running a 45.35 at the Japanese Olympic Trials in Nagoya at age 19.

References

External links
 
 
 
 
 

1996 births
Living people
People from Higashihiroshima
Sportspeople from Hiroshima Prefecture
Sportspeople from Kingston, Jamaica
Japanese male sprinters
Olympic male sprinters
Olympic athletes of Japan
Athletes (track and field) at the 2016 Summer Olympics
Asian Games bronze medalists for Japan
Asian Games medalists in athletics (track and field)
Athletes (track and field) at the 2018 Asian Games
Medalists at the 2018 Asian Games
Universiade medalists in athletics (track and field)
Universiade silver medalists for Japan
Japan Championships in Athletics winners
Japanese people of Jamaican descent
Naturalized citizens of Japan
Athletes (track and field) at the 2020 Summer Olympics